Suffer is the third album by American punk rock band Bad Religion, released on the Californian independent record label Epitaph Records on September 8, 1988. It was the first album that was both released and distributed by the label. Following the release of the EP Back to the Known (1985), Bad Religion went on a temporary hiatus, then reunited with its original members (except drummer Jay Ziskrout) and went to work on their first full-length studio album in five years.

Although Suffer did not chart on the Billboard 200, it has been cited by some critics as one of the most important punk rock albums of all time. A plethora of third-wave punk bands cite Suffer as a major inspiration, including NOFX's Fat Mike, who called it "the record that changed everything." NOFX later referenced the album with their 2001 EP, Surfer.

The songs, "You Are (The Government)", "1000 More Fools", "How Much Is Enough?", "Land of Competition", "Best For You", "Suffer", "What Can You Do?", and "Do What You Want", are all fan favorites, and a few of those are staples of their live show. Up until 2018, the only song from Suffer that was never performed live was "Part IV (The Index Fossil)".

Background
Bad Religion was formed in Southern California in 1980 by vocalist Greg Graffin and guitarist Brett Gurewitz. The pair hired Jay Bentley on bass and Jay Ziskrout on drums and began writing songs. In 1981, the band released their eponymous debut EP on the newly formed label, Epitaph Records, which was and continues to be managed and owned by Gurewitz. In 1982, the band released their first full-length album, How Could Hell Be Any Worse?, gaining the band a sizable following. During the recording of that album, Ziskrout left the band and was replaced by Pete Finestone. After experiencing more lineup changes and releasing their second album, Into the Unknown (1983), to lukewarm response, Bad Religion called it quits in 1984.

In 1984, Greg Hetson of Circle Jerks fame, who had played the guitar solo for "Part III" on How Could Hell Be Any Worse?, teamed up with Graffin on the song "Running Fast" for the soundtrack of the film Desperate Teenage Lovedolls. Soon after, Graffin reassembled Bad Religion with Hetson replacing Gurewitz, who had gone into rehab for his drug problem. Bad Religion returned to a somewhat mellower, rock and roll version of their original sound with the EP Back to the Known (1985), but disbanded temporarily soon after.

By 1987, Gurewitz had cleaned up his drug issues and struggled to find some kind of employment. After taking some vocational courses and a raft of odd jobs, he became a studio engineer and owner of a recording studio. Gurewitz noted, "I really enjoyed, still enjoy, being a recording engineer, but I had a terrible time trying to make any money. And my hours were horrible. I just knew I wanted to be in music. Then, in 1987, Bad Religion said, 'Hey man, why don't we get the group back together?". After Bad Religion finally reunited, they began writing new material and entered Westbeach Recorders in April 1988 to record their next album. According to Gurewitz, the album took eight days for the band to record and mix.

During recording sessions, the band even demoed a revamped version of "Fuck Armageddon...This Is Hell", a track previously released on How Could Hell Be Any Worse?. Whether they intended to include the song on Suffer is unknown and most unlikely.

Members of L7 (who released their first album on Epitaph the same year) played on the record. Donita Sparks and Suzi Gardner played guitar on "Best for You" and Jennifer Finch sang back-up vocals on "Part II (The Numbers Game)".

Reception and legacy

The album received critical acclaim. Robert Christgau gave the album a "B" saying; "This comeback is hailed as a hardcore milestone, probably because it's coherent. Relatively sane as their bitter analysis is—and I mean relative to both hardcore despair and mainstream complacency—it sounds a little pat. As if they're already a little slow for speedrock and don't want to upset the apple cart."

The album also received acclaim by the following magazines:

Alternative Press (3/02, p. 96) – Included in AP's "Essential Punk Influences '02 Style" – "...Their definitive album....they'd never eclipse this fireball of creative energy."
Kerrang! (p. 51) – "[With] sonorous, soaring vocal hooks. The melding of power and melody proved a statement of absolute power."

In a fan poll, "Do What You Want" was cited as one of the best Bad Religion songs of all time, along with "American Jesus" and "Along The Way." Rancid's Tim Armstrong has said that "What Can You Do?" is his favorite Bad Religion track.

In 2006, Suffer was ranked as the top punk album of 1988 on Sputnikmusic. The album was also named the 99th most influential rock album of all time by Kerrang! magazine. It placed at #6 on LA Weekly's "Top 20 Punk Albums in History".

To celebrate its 250th issue, German music magazine Visions asked 250 famous musicians across all genres of rock music to review the one album that musically influenced them the most. Both Fat Mike of NOFX and Chuck Ragan of Hot Water Music chose Suffer.

Artwork
The album cover features a drawing of a teenager on fire wearing a T-shirt with Bad Religion's crossbuster logo, designed by Jerry Mahoney, on the back. The person on the cover has been taken by the band as a mascot; "Boy on Fire" is the name and he can also be seen on Bad Religion accessories, including T-shirts. NOFX paid homage to the cover art on its Surfer EP, which depicts a surfer on fire wearing a wetsuit with NOFX's "prohibited FX" symbol on the back, at a beach. It was painted by Mark deSalvo.

Accolades
The information regarding accolades attributed to Suffer is adapted from AcclaimedMusic.net.

Track listing

Release history

Personnel
 Greg Graffin – vocals
 Brett Gurewitz – guitar
 Greg Hetson – guitar
 Jay Bentley – bass guitar
 Pete Finestone – drums
 Donita Sparks - additional guitar on "Best for You"
 Suzi Gardner - additional guitar on "Best for You"
 Jennifer Finch - back-up vocals on "Part II (The Numbers Game)"
 Donnell Cameron – engineer
 Legendary Starbolt – engineer
 Jerry Mahoney – artwork

References

External links

Suffer at YouTube (streamed copy where licensed)

Bad Religion albums
1988 albums
Epitaph Records albums